Samuel Page was an English professional footballer who played as a goalkeeper.

References

Year of birth missing
Year of death missing
People from Rowley Regis
English footballers
Association football goalkeepers
Halesowen Town F.C. players
Burnley F.C. players
St Johnstone F.C. players
St Mirren F.C. players
English Football League players